Gough is an unincorporated community and census-designated place (CDP) in Burke County, Georgia, United States.

Gough was founded in 1905, and named after J. P. Gough, the original owner of the site.

It first appeared as a CDP in the 2020 Census with a population of 137.

Demographics

2020 census

Note: the US Census treats Hispanic/Latino as an ethnic category. This table excludes Latinos from the racial categories and assigns them to a separate category. Hispanics/Latinos can be of any race.

References

Census-designated places in Georgia (U.S. state)
Unincorporated communities in Burke County, Georgia
Unincorporated communities in Georgia (U.S. state)